Lamaload Reservoir is a reservoir near Rainow, Cheshire, England. It lies in the South West Peak within the Peak District National Park, to the west of the Goyt Valley, and is fed by the River Dean. It serves Macclesfield, which lies to its west. The reservoir and associated water treatment works are owned by United Utilities.

Built between 1958 and 1964 by Costain Construction Company, Lamaload was the first concrete reservoir in England. At 308 metres above sea level, the dam is of a round-headed buttress type construction and can contain 420,000,000 imperial gallons (1,910,000 m³) of water forming the reservoir. The public car park was built on the location of the pre-existing Lamaload Farm buildings, some of which are now used to house the public amenities at the site. 
 
Among the most popular locations for tourists in the South West Peak, Lamaload is used for fishing and birdwatching, and also forms an important access point for walkers to the surrounding moorland. Shining Tor, the highest point in Cheshire, and Windgather Rocks, lie within a few miles. The reservoir is surrounded by moorland, broad-leaved woodland and plantations of larch and pine. Facilities include a car park (not open all year) and picnic tables.

See also

 List of reservoirs and dams in the United Kingdom

References

External links
United Utilities
The Goyt Valley, Peak District National Park Authority
Walking Britain: Shining Tor & Windgather Rocks from Lamaload

Reservoirs of the Peak District
Tourist attractions in Cheshire
Reservoirs in Cheshire